Rochdi "Roch" Karaa is a Tunisian former professional footballer who played as a goalkeeper for Darlington.

Career
Born in Sousse, Tunisia, Karaa began his career in his home country, and was capped for the Tunisia under-21 national team. He later moved to England, where he was signed by Fourth Division side Darlington. He made his debut for the club on the final game of the 1984–85 season against Torquay United, becoming the first Tunisian to play in the English Football League. He made no further appearances for the club.

In 2002, Karaa opened a catering company in Morpeth.

References

Year of birth missing (living people)
Living people
Tunisian footballers
Association football goalkeepers
Darlington F.C. players
English Football League players
Tunisian expatriate footballers
Expatriate footballers in England